Kamal Hassan Muhammad Abdelrahim (born 5 June 1974) is an Egyptian rower. He competed in the 2000 Summer Olympics.

References

1974 births
Living people
Rowers at the 2000 Summer Olympics
Egyptian male rowers
Olympic rowers of Egypt